Iwanaga-hime is a kami in Japanese mythology. She is also the daughter of Ōyamatsumi, and sister to Konohanasakuya-hime. She is said to be enshrined at Kifune Shrine.

Mythology 
Ōyamatsumi offered both his daughters Konohana Sakuyahime and Iwanagahime in marriage to Ninigi. However Ninigi rejected Iwanagahime due to her appearance and returned her to her father. 

According to the Kojiki, Ōyamatsumi told Ninigi that he have offered both his daughters so that the emperors would live forever like the rocks. But since Iwanagahime was rejected, the emperors will live short lives.

According to one version of the Nihongi, Iwanagahime was angered and cursed the emperors and all other beings to have shorter lives like the tree blossoms. The story is used as an explanation for the shortness of human life. 

In a different version of the Nihongi, Ninigi found both sisters weaving a loom in a palace.

References 

Shinto kami
Kunitsukami